Vinod Kumar Binny (born 1973) is an Indian politician and was an MLA from Laxmi Nagar in Delhi.

He was member of Aam Aadmi Party (AAP) from 2013 to 2014. He later joined Bharatiya Janata Party (BJP) in 2015.

Political career
Before joining AAP in 2013, he contested election twice as an independent candidate and won both the times. During Delhi elections held in 2013, he was elected as an MLA from Laxmi Nagar constituency.  He had defeated Ashok Kumar Walia of Indian National Congress by around 8,000 votes. In December 2013, he had walked out of a meeting in which the AAP decided its members for the cabinet, but was reportedly talked out of escalating the crisis. In January 2014, Binny accused the AAP of betraying people of Delhi and straying from principles. On 26 January 2014, he was expelled from AAP in a disciplinary action and his primary membership of the party was terminated. He moved to Delhi High Court seeking protection of his MLA rights and for continuing as an independent legislator.

Before 2015 Delhi Legislative Assembly election, he joined BJP on 18 January 2015 and contested from Patparganj. He lost against his former colleague from Aam Aadmi Party, Manish Sisodia by a margin of 28,761 votes.

References

Delhi MLAs 2013–2015
Living people
1973 births
People from East Delhi district
Bharatiya Janata Party politicians from Delhi
Former members of Indian National Congress from Delhi
Former members of Aam Aadmi Party from Delhi